The Serra de Santa Bárbara State Park is a state park in the state of Mato Grosso, Brazil. 
It preserves a unique environment where the Amazon rainforest, pantanal and cerrado meet, and holds many endemic or endangered species.

Location

The Serra de Santa Bárbara State Park is divided between the municipalities of Porto Esperidião (27.13%) and Pontes e Lacerda (72.87%) in the state of Mato Grosso.
It is in the Vale do Guaporé, between the states of Mato Grosso and Rondônia to the north of the border with Bolivia.

The park is in the Pantanal Biosphere Reserve, which also includes the Pantanal, Chapada dos Guimarães, Emas and Serra da Bodoquena national parks, and the Nascentes do Rio Taquari and Pantanal de Rio Negro state parks.
The Gomalina, Alegre and Aguapeí rivers rise in the park.
Highway MT-473 runs to the west of the park, and highway MT-265 runs to the south.
There are several archaeological sites from the precolonial and colonial periods.

History

Law 7.165 of 23 August 1999 confirmed the decree.
The management plan was approved on 11 December 2008.
The consultative council was created on 15 December 2014.

Environment

The Serra de Santa Bárbara has one of the most diverse ecosystems in the state, covering an area of transition between the Amazon rainforest, cerrado and pantanal.
The forest types include semi-deciduous seasonal forests, the transition from these to cerrado, cerrado proper, and the transition to rocky fields and to pantanal formations.
In the pantanal regions there are large seasonal variations, with most of the area flooded in the rainy season.
However, most of the vegetation in the park is cerrado.
The areas of Amazon rainforest provide islands and shelters for animals during the floods.
The fauna is very rich, and included endemic or endangered species such as Linnaeus's two-toed sloth (Choloepus didactylus), southern tamandua (Tamandua tetradactyla), jaguar (Panthera onca), Amazon river dolphin (Inia geoffrensis) and tucuxi (Sotalia fluviatilis).

Threats include fires, illegal logging and the advance of agriculture around the park.
As of 2005 about 3.7% of the park had been deforested, of which  had been deforested before creation in 1997, and  had been deforested since then..
In 2010 a scheme was uncovered where fraudulently issued titles for land in the park issued by the Instituto Nacional de Colonização e Reforma Agrária (Incra) were being sold to farmers, who would then claim compensation.

Notes

Sources

Further reading

1997 establishments in Brazil
State parks of Brazil
Protected areas of Mato Grosso
Protected areas established in 1997
Pantanal
Cerrado